Riverside Township is one of twenty-two townships in Adams County, Illinois, United States. As of the 2010 census, its population was 2,151 and it contained 965 housing units.

Geography

Unincorporated towns
 North Quincy

Major highways
  US Route 24

Airports and landing strips
 Blickhan Landing Area

Rivers
 Mississippi River

Lakes
 Goose Lake
 Long Island Lake

Demographics
As of the 2020 census there were 2,103 people, 734 households, and 596 families residing in the township. The racial makeup of the township was 92.72% White, 0.90% African American, 0.29% Native American, 0.71% Asian, 0.00% Pacific Islander, 0.57% from other races, and 4.80% from two or more races. Hispanic or Latino of any race were 1.62% of the population.

There were 734 households, out of which 20.70% had children under the age of 18 living with them, 75.61% were married couples living together, 3.00% had a female householder with no spouse present, and 18.80% were non-families. 15.90% of all households were made up of individuals, and 11.20% had someone living alone who was 65 years of age or older. The average household size was 2.24 and the average family size was 2.45.

The township's age distribution consisted of 17.1% under the age of 18, 2.1% from 18 to 24, 13% from 25 to 44, 37.4% from 45 to 64, and 30.3% who were 65 years of age or older. The median age was 55.8 years. For every 100 females, there were 91.5 males. For every 100 females age 18 and over, there were 94.4 males.

The median income for a household in the township was $96,776, and the median income for a family was $95,921. Males had a median income of $54,426 versus $45,208 for females. The per capita income for the township was $54,679. About 1.5% of families and 3.2% of the population were below the poverty line, including 0.0% of those under age 18 and 7.2% of those age 65 or over.

School districts
 Quincy School District 172

Political districts
 Illinois' 17th congressional district
 State House District 93
 State Senate District 47

References
 
 United States Census Bureau 2007 TIGER/Line Shapefiles
 United States National Atlas

External links
 List of Adams County township trustees
 City-Data.com
 Illinois State Archives

Townships in Adams County, Illinois
1849 establishments in Illinois
Townships in Illinois